Mia is a simple dice game with a strong emphasis on bluffing and detecting bluff related to Liar's dice.

Equipment
Two dice and either a flat bottomed container with a lid or a dice cup are needed.  This game is played by three or more players.

Play
All players start with six lives. Usually the players use a die to keep track of their lives, counting down from 6 to 1 as they lose lives.

The first player rolls the dice and keeps their value concealed from the other players in or under the container.  The player then has three choices:

Tell the truth and announce what has been rolled.
Lie and announce a greater value than that rolled.
Lie and announce a lesser value.

The concealed dice are then passed to the next player in a clockwise fashion.  The receiving player now has two options:

Believe the passer, roll the dice and pass it on, announcing a higher value—with or without looking at them. (For a poor liar it may be sensible to not look at the dice.)
Call the passer a liar and look at the dice.  If the dice show a lesser value than that announced, the passer loses a life and the receiving player starts a new round.  However, if the dice show a greater or equal value, the current player loses a life and the next player starts a new round.

Some players play with a third option: Pass the dice to the next player without rolling or looking at them, announcing the same or a higher value. This relieves the original passer of all responsibility. This choice rests on the assumption that the previous player announced a lesser value than they rolled, which may be a sensible choice if they want to get at a player further down the line.

Note that each player must always announce a value greater than the previous value announced, unless she or he is passed a Mia in which case the round ends.

If Mia is announced, the next player has two choices:

They may give up without looking at the dice and lose one life.
They may look at the dice. If it was a Mia, they lose two lives. If it wasn't, the previous player loses one life as usual.

The first player to lose all of their lives loses the game.

Scoring
Unlike most dice games, the value of the roll is not the sum of the dice. Instead, the highest die is multiplied by ten and then added to the other die. So a 2 and a 1 is 21 and a 5 and 6 is 65. The highest roll is 21 which is called Mia, followed by the doubles from 66 to 11, and then all other rolls from 65 down to 31. Thus, the complete order of rolls (from highest to lowest) is 21 (Mia), 66, 55, 44, 33, 22, 11, 65, 64, 63, 62, 61, 54, 53, 52, 51, 43, 42, 41, 32, 31.

Strategy 
The appeal of Mia resides primarily in the potential it affords for bluffing. As with other games of bluff, this is partly a psychological challenge. It is important to know the other players and master the subtleties of more or less conscious interpersonal communication. A common strategy is to develop a "character". A player may, for instance pretend to be a truthful person, a notorious liar, a constantly lucky roller, or one that usually tries to get at players beyond the next player. This will make the actions of the other players more predictable, which will give the player an advantage.

It is, however, also about statistics. In particular, one should be aware that 54 is the "middle" roll, in the sense that if a player announces 54, there is a 50% chance that the next player will roll a better value. In the Danish version called Meyer, the middle roll is 62.

Since there are two ways to achieve any result that is not a double roll (e.g., a result of 43 can be achieved by rolling either a 3-4 or a 4–3), while doubles can only be made in one way, the middle roll in this game is not 62 but rather 54, despite the fact that ten possible results sit above and below the former, while there are twelve possible results above and eight below the latter. Nevertheless, owing to the "off-balance" structure of possible results, relative to possible rolls of two dice (21 possible results, 36 possible dice rolls), the likelihood that someone rolling a 62 (the numeric median result) will be beaten by a subsequent roller is only about 39 percent, while someone rolling a 54 (the statistical, or actual, median result) is facing exactly even odds. The complete list of possible results, and the approximate likelihood (x%) of each being beaten on a single subsequent roll, is as follows:

Variations
Many variations and house rules exist. 31 may be considered the 2nd best roll (called "little Mia") instead of the worst, and 32 (called "joker") may also be assigned special functions. The order of the rolls 66 to 11 may be reversed. The rolls from 31 to 65 might be represented by just stating the sum of the two dice, so that e.g. both 62 and 53 are called "8 pips" and have the same value, better than "7 pips" (including 61) but worse than "9 pips" (including 54). The penalty whenever Mia is involved may be doubled so that one loses two lives instead of one. The requirement that one must announce more than the previous player can be relaxed so that one just has to announce at least the same, but then, the option of passing on the dice without looking would be banned. It can also be played that the dice roll *must* be beaten, ensuring drama for a Mia.

Drinking Mia also exists, whereby instead of a life, a finger/swig may be imbibed instead. Typically Mia comes with a 'stiff' penalty also, a whole drink.

References

External links
Lore and Saga: The Ancient Dice Game of Mia
BoardGameGeek article on Mia 

Dice games